London Babulu is a 2017 Indian Telugu-language satirical comedy film directed by Chinni Krishna and produced by Maruthi.

It stars Swathi Reddy in the lead role along with Rakshith Atluri. The film was released on 10 November 2017. It is a remake of the 2016 Tamil film Aandavan Kattalai (2016). Rakshith won Best Debut Actor Award at 16th Santosham Film Awards.

Songs and background score for the film have been composed by K.

Cast
Rakshit Atluri as Gandhi
Swati Reddy as Suryakantham
Satya as Pandu
Murali Sharma as Sharma
Dhanraj as Bablu
Ali as Kutumba Rao
Satya Krishnan as Kutumba's assistant
Raja Ravindra
Jeeva
Ajay Ghosh

Production
After the release of "Aandavan Kattalai" and seeing its reception, the rights of the movie were acquired and later remade in Telugu.

Soundtrack 
K, who composed the soundtrack of the original, composed the soundtrack of this film.

 "Ekkada Ekkada" - Karthik
 "Babu Jabu Vachera" - Deepak
 "Nightu Nine" - Saicharan, Shenbagaraj, Jiby, Depu, K, Deepak, Philip
 "Paapam Pilladevaro" - Anthony Daasan
 "Thirigi Thirigi" - K

Release 
A critic from The Times of India gave the film a rating of two-and-a-half out of five stars and wrote that "The chemistry between the lead pair is just not established and it is unfortunate because there was ample scope for it". A critic from Firstpost wrote that "London Babulu delivers plenty of laughs and also makes you think why people are so desperate to go abroad through illegal means. And that is where it triumphs as a story. It has its heart in the right place".

References

Indian comedy-drama films
Films about illegal immigration to Europe
Films scored by K (composer)
Films about theatre
Indian satirical films
2017 films
2010s Telugu-language films
Telugu remakes of Tamil films